Ivan Čaklec (5 August 1932 – 30 March 2018) was a Croatian gymnast. He competed at the 1952 Summer Olympics, the 1960 Summer Olympics and the 1964 Summer Olympics.

References

1932 births
2018 deaths
Croatian male artistic gymnasts
Olympic gymnasts of Yugoslavia
Gymnasts at the 1952 Summer Olympics
Gymnasts at the 1960 Summer Olympics
Gymnasts at the 1964 Summer Olympics
Sportspeople from Varaždin
Burials at Miroševac Cemetery